Corbeil may refer to:

Places 
 Corbeil, Ontario, Canada
 Corbeil, Marne, a commune in the Marne département in north-eastern France
 Corbeil-Cerf, a commune in the département of Oise in northern France
 Corbeil-Essonnes, a commune in the southern suburbs of Paris, France
 Corbeil Cathedral, superseded by the cathedral at Évry
 Roman Catholic Diocese of Évry–Corbeil-Essonnes
 Saint-Germain-lès-Corbeil, a commune in the Essonne département in northern France

People 
 Corbeil (surname)
 Gilles de Corbeil (c. 1140-before 1225), French physician, teacher and poet
 Isaac ben Joseph of Corbeil (13th century), French rabbi and tosefist
 Peter of Corbeil (died 1222), preacher and canon of Nôtre Dame de Paris
 William de Corbeil (c. 1070-1136), archbishop of Canterbury

Historical events 
 Treaty of Corbeil (1258) between France and Aragon
 Treaty of Corbeil (1326) between France and Scotland

Other 
 Corbeil Buses, a school bus manufacturer in Kansas, USA
 Corbeil XIII, a Rugby League club in Corbeil-Essonnes, France